Andrzej Boryszewski (1435 – 20 April 1510) was a Polish Roman Catholic priest. He was coadjutor bishop of Lviv in the years 1488–1493, metropolitan archbishop of Lviv in the years 1493–1503, apostolic administrator of Przemyśl in 1501 –1503, metropolitan archbishop of Gniezno and the primate of Poland in the years 1503–1510, interrex He died in Łowicz.

References

External links
 Virtual tour Gniezno Cathedral 
List of Primates of Poland 

1435 births
1510 deaths
Archbishops of Gniezno